Jason Trey Hooten (born April 20, 1969) is the head coach of the Sam Houston State University Men's Basketball team. Jason Hooten had previously served on the staff as an assistant coach for the previous six years, but was named as the Bearkats' new head men's basketball coach on April 2, 2010. In his ten seasons with the Bearkats, Hooten has helped direct the program to a 127-59 record and four 20-plus victory seasons. The 25-8 record for Sam Houston in 2009-10 marks the highest victory total for a Bearkat squad in SHSU's 23 seasons at the NCAA Division I level. Sam Houston stands as one of only 52 programs out of the 340 teams in Division I basketball that have posted 20 or more wins four of the last five years. Among those 52 teams, the Kats have the 28th-best winning percentage.

Early life
Hooten is a 1987 graduate of Killeen Ellison High School and lettered in basketball and baseball. He earned all-district, All-CenTex and All-Super CenTex while leading his team to the bi-district championship as a senior. He holds school career records for scoring and assists. In baseball, he twice earned All-District honorable mention and lettered three years. Hooten holds two degrees from Tarleton State, earning a bachelor's in exercise and sport studies in 1993 and a master's in 1995. Hooten played two years at McLennan Community College, where he was an honorable mention all-conference selection and led his team to a league title. At Tarleton, he earned two letters under Lonn Reisman, helping lead the Texans to a 52-10 mark.

Early coaching career
Hooten served as assistant men's basketball coach at Tarleton State University for Lonn Reisman. During his tenure, the Texans posted a combined 204-111 record. He returned to Tarleton in August 1993 after serving as a part-time assistant coach at Weatherford Junior College. Hooten assisted in all aspects of the men's basketball program, with particular emphasis in recruiting and scheduling.
Hooten's recruiting efforts played a key role in Tarleton's 82-16 overall record his final three seasons with the Texans. In 2004, Tarleton posted a 28-4 record and claimed both the Lone Star Conference North Division title and the LSC Championship. The Texans won back-to-back North Division championships with a 29-4 record in 2002-03 and a 25-8 mark in 2001-02. During Hooten's 11 seasons with the Texans, nine players earned first team All-LSC honors and five were All-America. Hooten also coached and recruited Tim Burnette who was named Texas Association of Basketball Coaches Small College Player of the Year in 2004.

Hooten joined the SHSU staff July 1, 2004, helping run practice, recruiting, scouting, scheduling and academics. In 2009, RecruitingRumors.com selected Hooten as one of the top 100 NCAA assistant coaches. Last July, CollegeInsider.com named him Mid-Major Top 25 assistant coaches honorable mention. Hooten served under Bob Marlin who coached the Kats to a 225-131 record the past 12 seasons. Marlin now is head coach at the University of Louisiana at Lafayette. In his six seasons with the Bearkats, Hooten has helped direct the program to a 127-59 record, four 20-plus victory seasons, Southland Conference regular season and tournament championships and an NCAA tournament appearance in 2010. The 25-8 record for Sam Houston in 2009-10 marks the highest victory total for a Bearkat squad in SHSU's 23 seasons at the NCAA Division I level.

Head coaching career
Hooten's inaugural game as coach of the SHSU Bearkats came in 72-47 win over the University of Mary Hardin-Baylor at home in Johnson Coliseum. Following his first win, Hooten went on to go 3-1 in his first month of coaching. Through the 2010-2011 season, Hooten led the Bearkats to an 18-13 record, going 10-6 in the Southland Conference, while earning the Bearkats a #3 Seed in the Southland Conference Tournament. Hooten won his first post-season game as a head coach, knocking off rival #6 Stephen F. Austin in the opening round 61-45. The second round game resulted in a loss to the eventual conference tournament champions, UT-San Antonio 79-70.

Coaching record

References

1969 births
Living people
Basketball coaches from Texas
Basketball players from Texas
College men's basketball head coaches in the United States
Junior college men's basketball players in the United States
McLennan Community College alumni
Sportspeople from Killeen, Texas
Sam Houston Bearkats men's basketball coaches
Tarleton State Texans men's basketball players